Jharkhand is a state in eastern India. The state shares its border with the states of West Bengal to the east, Chhattisgarh to the west, Uttar Pradesh to the northwest, Bihar to the north and Odisha to the south. It is the 15th largest state by area, and the 14th largest by population. Hindi is the official language of the state. The city of Ranchi is its capital and Dumka its sub-capital. The state is known for its waterfalls, hills and holy places; Baidyanath Dham, Parasnath, Dewri and Rajrappa are major religious sites. The state was formed on 15 November 2000, after carving out what was previously the southern half of Bihar.

Jharkhand suffers from what is sometimes termed a resource curse: it accounts for more than 40% of the mineral resources of India, but 39.1% of its population is below the poverty line and 19.6% of children under five years of age are malnourished. Jharkhand is primarily rural, with about 24% of its population living in cities. It is amongst the leading states in terms of economic growth. In 2017–18, the GDP growth rate of state was at 10.22%.

Etymology
The word "Jhar means 'forest' and "Khand means 'land' in various Indo-Aryan languages. Thus "Jharkhand" means forest land.

In the ancient period, in the  Mahabharata, the region was referred as Kark Khand due to location near Kark Rekha i.e. Tropic of Cancer. During the Medieval period, the region was known as Jharkhand. According to Bhavishya Purana (1200 CE), Jharkhand was one of the seven Pundra desa. The name is first found on a 13th-century copper plate in Kendrapada, Odisha region from the reign of Narasimha Deva II of Eastern Ganga dynasty. Forest land from Baidhnath dham to Puri was known as Jharkhand. In Akbarnama, from Panchet in the east to Ratanpur to west, Rohtasgarh to the north and the frontier of Odisha to the south was known as Jharkhand.

History

Ancient period
The region has been inhabited since the Mesolithic-Chalcolithic period, as shown by several ancient cave paintings. 
Stone tools have been discovered from Chota Nagpur plateau region which is from Mesolithic and Neolithic period. There are ancient cave paintings in Isko, Hazaribagh district which are from Meso-chalcolithic period (9000–5000 BCE). During 2nd millennium BCE the use of Copper tools spread in Chota Nagpur Plateau and these find complex are known as the Copper Hoard Culture. In Kabra-Kala mound at the confluence of Son and North Koel rivers in Palamu district various antiquities and art objects have found which are from Neolithic to the medieval period and the pot-sherds of Redware, black and red ware, black ware, black slipped ware and NBP ware are from Chalcolithic to the late medieval period. Several iron slags, microliths, and potsherds have been discovered from Singhbhum district which are from 1400 BCE according to carbon dating age. The region was ruled by many empires and dynasties including Nanda, Maurya and Gupta during ancient period.

In Mahabharata, the region was referred as Kark Khand due to its location near Tropic of Cancer. During the age of Mahajanpadas around 500 BCE, Jharkhand state was a part of Magadha and Anga. In the Mauryan period, this region was ruled by a number of states, which were collectively known as the Atavika (forest) states. These states were subdued and were forced to accept the hegemony of the Maurya empire during Ashoka's reign (c. 232 BCE). In ancient site of Saridkel, burnt bricks houses, red ware pottery, copper tools, coins and iron tools found which are belongs to early centuries CE. The Brahmi Inscription have been found in Khunti district which are from 3rd century BCE. Samudragupta, while marching through the present-day Chotanagpur region (North and South), directed the first attack against the kingdom of Dakshina Kosala in the Mahanadi valley.

Medieval period
In the 7th century, Chinese traveller Xuanzang passed through the region. He described the kingdom as Karnasuvarna, with Shashanka as its ruler. To the north of Karn-Suberna was Magadha, Champa was in east, Mahendra in the west and Orissa in the south.

During medieval period, the region ruled by Nagvanshi, Pala, Khayaravala, Ramgarh Raj and Chero ruler. A Buddhist monastery has been found in Hazaribagh which was built during the Pala rule in 10th century. Bhim Karn was Nagvanshi king during medieval period. He defeated Raksel dynasty of Surguja when they Invaded the reign with cavalry.

Modern period
The Mughal influence reached Palamu during the reign of Emperor Akbar when it was conquered  by Rajput
Raja Mansingh in 1574. Several invasion took place during Mughal rule. During the reign of Nagvanshi King Madhu Singh, Akbar' general invaded Khukhra. Also there was invasion during region of Durjan Shah.

King Ram Shah ruled Navratangarh from 1640 to 1663. He built Kapilnath Temple in 1643. He succeeded by his son Raghunath Shah. Thakur Ani Nath Shahdeo built Jagannath temple of Ranchi in 1691. The King Medini Ray, ruled from 1658 to 1674 in Palamau. His rule extended to areas in South Gaya and Hazaribagh. He attacked Navratangarh and defeated the Nagvanshi Maharaja of Chhotanagpur. The Chero rule in Palamu region lasted until the 19th century, until internal conflict between various factions weakened the Cheros and they were defeated by the East India Company. Later Palamu estate was sold by the British.

During 18th century, region under Kings of Chero dynasty, Nagvanshi dynasty, Ramgarh and Kharagdiha became parts of territories of East India Company. Ramgarh Raj along with estates of other chiefs in the regions was permanently settled as Zamindari estate. The Kharagdiha Rajas were settled as Rajas of Raj Dhanwar in 1809, and the Kharagdiha gadis were separately settled as zamindari estates. Some of the notable Kharagdiha Zamindari estates were Koderma, Gadi Palganj and Ledo Gadi. The Princely states in Chota Nagpur Plateau, came within the sphere of influence of the Maratha Empire, but they became tributary states of British East India Company as a result of the Anglo-Maratha Wars known as Chota Nagpur Tributary States.

The subjugation, colonization and tax imposition by the British East India Company resulted in spontaneous resistance from the local people. The first revolt against the British East India Company was the first Chuar revolt led by Jagannath Singh, zamindar of Ghatsila in 1766 and Dhal revolt led by Raja Jagannath Dhal, King of Dhalbhum in 1767. In 1769, again Raghunath Mahato revolted against the British East India Company (EIC).

In 1771, the revolt against the landlords and the British government was led by Tilka Majhi, a Paharia leader in Rajmahal Hills. Soon after in 1779, the Bhumij tribes again rose in arms against the British rule in Manbhum, called Chuar Rebellion. In 1807, the Oraons in Barway murdered their landlord from Srinagar. Munda tribe rose in revolt in 1811 and 1813. Bakhtar Say and Mundal Singh, two landowners, fought against the British East India Company in 1812.

The Hos in Singhbhum revolted in 1820 and Kol revolt in 1832. Also in 1832 Bhumijs again revolted against the British under the leadership of Ganga Narayan Singh, known as Bhumij Rebellion. During 19th century, large numbers of santals from Manbhum, Hazaribagh, Midnapore were settled by British in Damin-i-koh to cultivate the land and generate revenue. But Santal were revolt against tax imposition.
The Santhal rebellion broke out in 1855 under the leadership of two brothers Sidhu and Kanhu. Later British  renamed it as Santal Pargana.

Thakur Vishwanath Shahdeo and Pandey Ganpat Rai rebelled against the British East India Company in the 1857 rebellion. In the Battle of Chatra, conflict took place between the rebels and the East India company. Tikait Umrao Singh, Sheikh Bhikhari, Nadir Ali and Jai Mangal Singh played pivotal role in the Indian Rebellion of 1857. The brothers Nilambar and Pitambar were chiefs of Bhogta clan of the Kharwar tribe, who held ancestral jagirs with many Chero Jagirdars led revolt against British East India company.

After the Indian Rebellion of 1857, the rule of the British East India Company was transferred to the Crown in the person of Queen Victoria, who, in 1876, was proclaimed Empress of India. The Cheros and Kharwars again rebelled against the British in 1882 but the attack was repulsed. Then Birsa Munda revolt, broke out in 1895 and lasted until 1900. The revolt though mainly concentrated in the Munda belt of Khunti, Tamar, Sarwada and Bandgaon.

In October 1905, the exercise of British influence over the predominantly Hindi-speaking states of Chang Bhakar, Jashpur, Koriya, Surguja, and Udaipur was transferred from the Bengal government to that of the Central Provinces, while the two Oriya-speaking states of Gangpur and Bonai were attached to the Orissa Tributary States, leaving only Kharsawan and Saraikela answerable to the Bengal governor.

In 1936, all nine states were transferred to the Eastern States Agency, the officials of which came under the direct authority of the Governor-General of India, rather than under that of any provinces.

In March 1940, INC 53rd Session was accomplished under the presidency of Maulana Abul Qalam Azad at Jhanda Chowk, Ramgarh now Ramgarh Cantonment. Mahatma Gandhi, Jawaharlal Nehru, Sardar Patel, Rajendra Prasad, Sarojini Naidu, Khan Abdul Ghaffar Khan, Acharya J.B. Kripalani, Industrialist Jamnalal Bajaj and others greats leaders of Indian freedom movement attended the Ramgarh Session. Mahatma Gandhi also opened khadi and village Industries Exhibition at Ramgarh.

At that time, under the leadership of Netajee Subhas Chandra Bose conference against Samjhauta was also completed. In Ramgarh, Subhas Chandra Bose was seen as president of All India Forward Block and M. N. Roy was seen as leader of Radical democratic party.

Post Independence
After Indian independence in 1947, the rulers of many states chose to accede to the Dominion of India. Changbhakar, Jashpur, Koriya, Surguja and Udaipur later became part of Madhya Pradesh state, but Gangpur and Bonai became part of Orissa state, and Kharsawan and Saraikela part of Bihar state. In 1928, separate state was demanded by Unnati Samaj, the political wing of the Christian Tribals Association, which submitted a memorandum to Simon Commission to constitute a tribal state in eastern India. Prominent leaders like Jaipal Singh Munda and Ram Narayan Singh also demanded a separate state. In 1955, the Jharkhand Party, led by Jaipal Singh Munda, submitted a memorandum to States Reorganization Commission for a separate Jharkhand state comprising the tribal area of South Bihar, but it was rejected because there were many languages, no link language in the region, tribal were in the minority, Hindustani was the majority language and adverse effect on economy of Bihar.

Later Sadan people, the native various caste/non-tribal groups, also joined the movement for a separate state. In 1972, Binod Bihari Mahato, Shibu Soren and A. K. Roy founded Jharkhand Mukti Morcha. Nirmal Mahto founded All Jharkhand Students Union. They led the movement for a separate state of Jharkhand. The Jharkhand coordination committee (JCC), consisting of Ram Dayal Munda, B. P. Keshri, Binod Bihari Mahato, Santosh Rana and Suraj Singh Besra started a new initiative and tried to coordinate between different parties. Keshri sent a memorandum to form Jharkhand state in 1988. Jharkhand co-ordination committee was then led by Congress General Secretary Ram Ratan Ram, who urged Rajiv Gandhi to pay attention to the issue at hand. 

In July 1988, Bharatiya Janata party led by Atal Bihari Vajpayee, Lal Krishna Advani and Murli Manohar Joshi decided to demand a separate state, Vanachal, comprising the forest region of South Bihar in Jamshedpur. Inder Singh Namdhari, Samresh Singh and Rudra Pratap Sarangi were the leaders of the Vanachal movement. They organised several rallies to form a separate state.

Central government formed a committee on the Jharkhand matter in 1989. It stressed the need of greater allocation of the development funds for the area. There was a provision for limited internal autonomy in the hill area of Assam. Other tribal areas were covered by the fifth schedule of the constitution. Chotanagpur and Santal Pargana development boards were constituted under the chairmanship of then Chief minister of Bihar under the provision of the fifth schedule in 1972. This failed to achieve the desired result. JMM wanted more representation and AJSU was against it. Due to differences these parties broke away from each other. The All Jharkhand Students Union introduced elements of violence in the movement and called for a boycott of election while Jharkhand Mukti Morcha opposed this. The Jharkhand Area Autonomous Council bill passed in Bihar legislative assembly in December 1994. The Jharkhand Area Autonomous Council were given responsibility for forty areas including agriculture, rural health, public work, public health and minerals. The council has power to recommend for legislation to the Assembly through the state government and to frame bylaws and regulations.

In 1998, when the separate state movement was falling apart, Justice Lal Pingley Nath Shahdeo was leading the movement. In 1998, the Union government decided to send the bill concerning the formation of Jharkhand state to Bihar Legislative Assembly to which Lalu Prasad Yadav had said that the state would be divided over his dead body. A total of 16 political parties including the Bharatiya Janata Party, Jharkhand Mukti Morcha, All Jharkhand Students Union and Congress came in one platform and formed the 'All Party Separate State Formation Committee' to start the movement. Shahdeo was elected as the convener of the committee. The voting on Jharkhand Act was to be done on 21 September 1998 in Bihar legislation. On that day the committee, under the leadership of Shahdeo called for Jharkhand Bandh and organised a protest march. Thousands of supporters of a separate state took to streets led by Shahdeo. He was arrested and detained in a police station for hours along with many supporters.

In 1999 Bharatiya Janata party promised to form a separate Vanachal state if they won the state election with a majority of votes. After the last Assembly election in the state resulted in a hung assembly, RJD's dependence on the Congress extended support on the precondition that RJD would not pose a hurdle to the passage of the Bihar reorganisation Bill. Finally, with the support from both RJD and Congress, the ruling coalition at the Centre led by the Bharatiya Janata Party which had made statehood its main poll plank in the region in successive polls earlier, cleared the Bihar reorganisation Bill in the monsoon session of the Parliament on 2 and 11 August in Loksabha and Rajyasabha. This paved the way for the creation of a separate Vanachal state comprising Chota Nagpur Division and Santhal Pargana Division of South Bihar. NDA formed the government with Babulal Marandi as chief minister. Later the name of the state was changed from Vanachal to Jharkhand. Babulal Marandi took the oath of chief minister on 15 November 2000 on the anniversary of the birth of tribal leader Birsa Munda.

Jharkhand statehood
The dynamics of resources and the politics of development still influence the socio-economic structures in Jharkhand, which was carved out of the relatively underdeveloped southern part of Bihar. According to the 1991 census, the state has a population of over 20 million out of which 28% is tribal while 12% of the people belong to scheduled castes. Jharkhand has 24 districts, 260 blocks, and 32,620 villages out of which only 45% have access to electricity while only 8,484 are connected by roads. Jharkhand is the leading producer of mineral wealth in the country after Chhattisgarh state, endowed as it is with a vast variety of minerals like iron ore, coal, copper ore, mica, bauxite, graphite, limestone, and uranium. Jharkhand is also known for its vast forest resources.

Naxal insurgency

Jharkhand has been at the centre of the Naxalite-Maoist insurgency. Since the uprising of the Naxalites in 1967, 6,000 people have been killed in fighting between the Naxalites and counter-insurgency operations by the police, and its paramilitary groups such as the Salwa Judum.

Despite having a presence in almost 7.80% of India's geographical area (home to 5.50% of India's population), the state of Jharkhand is part of the "Red Corridor" comprising 92,000 square kilometres, where the highest concentration of the groups estimated 20,000 combatants fight. Part of this is due to the fact that the state harbours an abundance of natural resources, while its people live in abject poverty and destitution. The impoverished state provides ample recruits for communist insurgents, who argue that they are fighting on behalf of the landless poor and tribals that see few benefits from the resource extractions. As the federal government holds a monopoly on sub-surface resources in the state, the tribal population is prevented from staking any claim on the resources extracted from their land. In response, the insurgents have recently begun a campaign of targeting infrastructure related to the extraction of resources vital for Indian energy needs, such as coal.

On 5 March 2007, Sunil Mahato, a member of the national parliament, was shot dead by Naxalite rebels near Kishanpur while watching a football match on the Hindu festival of Holi. His widow, Suman Mahato, the Jharkhand Mukti Morcha candidate, won the Jamshedpur Lok Sabha by-election in September 2007 and served in parliament until 2009.

Geography 
Jharkhand is located in the eastern part of India and is enclosed by West Bengal to the eastern side, Chhattisgarh and Uttar Pradesh to the western side, Bihar to the northern part and Odisha to the southern part.

Jharkhand envelops a geographical area of 7,970,000 hectare.  Much of Jharkhand lies on the Chota Nagpur Plateau. Many rivers pass through the Chota Nagpur plateau. They are: Damodar, North Koel, Barakar, South Koel, Sankh and Subarnarekha rivers. The higher watersheds of these rivers stretch out within the Jharkhand state. Much of the Jharkhand state is still enclosed by forest. Forests sustain the population of elephants and tigers.

Climate
Climate of Jharkhand varies from Humid subtropical in the north to tropical wet and dry in the south-east. The main seasons are summer, rainy, autumn, winter and spring. The summer lasts from mid-April to mid-June. Nearly half of the annual precipitation falls in July and August. The winter season lasts from November to February. Spring season lasts from mid-February to mid-April.

Hills and mountain ranges
 Parasnath: Parasnath Hill is also recognised as Sri Sammed Sikharji. The Parasnath Hill is situated in Giridih district of Jharkhand. It is a chief Jain pilgrimage site and the holy place for Jains. It is believed in the Jain culture that 20 of the 24 Tirthankaras attained Moksha from this place. The height of the hill is 1,365 meters.
 Netarhat: Netarhat is a town in Latehar district. Referred to as the "Queen of Chotanagpur", it is a hill station. Netarhat Residential School is located here. Netarhat Dam is also located in this area.
 Rajmahal Hills: These hills are located in Sahibganj and Godda districts of Eastern part of Jharkhand. The Rajmahal hills belong to the Jurassic era. These hills like others also have many waterfalls, lakes and greenery.
 Trikut: Trikut Hill is located ten kilometres away from Deoghar and lies on the way to Dumka in Jharkhand. Trikut hill is also called Trikutchal because there are 3 major peaks on the hill. The height of Trikut hill is 2470 feet.
 Tagore Hill: The Tagore Hill is also recognised as the Morabadi Hill. The Tagore hill is located in Morabadi, Ranchi. The brother of Rabindranath Tagore, Jyotirindranath Tagore had made a tour at Ranchi in the year 1908.

Main Rivers
 Ganga River: The holy river Ganga passes through the north-eastern district of Sahebganj. Cities on the banks of Ganga river in Jharkhand: Sahebganj, Pakur
 Son River: Origin of Son River: Amarkantak, Cities on the Shore of Son River: Sidhi
 Subarnarekha River: Origin of Subarnarekha River: (Nagdi Ranchi) Chota Nagpur Plateau, Cities on the Shore of Subarnarekha River: Ranchi, Chandil, Jamshedpur, Ghatshila, Gopiballavpur
 Kharkai River: Origin of Kharkai River: Mayurbhanj District, Odisha; Cities on the Shore of Kharkai River: Rairangpur, Adityapur, and enters the Subarnarekha river in north-western Jamshedpur.
 Damodar River: Origin of Damodar River: Chota Nagpur Plateau (Tori latehar), Cities on the Shore of Damodar River: latehar, lohardaga, Ramgarh, Gridih, Dhanbad, Bokaro, Asansol, Raniganj, Durgapur, Bardhaman
 North Koel River: Origin of North Koel River: Chota Nagpur plateau, Cities on Shore of North Koel River: Daltonganj
 South Koel River: Origin of South Koyal River: Chota Nagpur Plateau (Nagdi Ranchi), Cities on the Shore of South Koyal River: Manoharpur, Rourkela
 Lilajan River: Also known as Falgu river. Origin of Lilajan River: Northern Chota Nagpur Plateau, City on the Shore: Gaya
 Ajay River: Origin of Ajay River: Munger, Cities on the Shore of Ajay River: Purulia, Chittaranjan, Ilambazar, Jaydev Kenduli
 Mayurakshi River: Origin of Mayurakshi River: Trikut hill, City on the Shore of Mayurakshi River: Suri
 Barakar River: Origin: Padma in Hazaribagh, Barakar Nadi flows through the districts of Koderma, Giridih, Hazaribagh, etc.

For the list of dams built across these revere refer to

Flora and Fauna 
Jharkhand has a rich variety of flora and fauna. The national parks and the zoological gardens in the state of Jharkhand present a panorama of this variety.

Part of the reason for the variety and diversity of flora and fauna found in Jharkhand state may be accredited to the Palamau Tiger Reserves under the Project Tiger. This reserve is abode to hundreds of species of flora and fauna, as indicated within brackets: mammals (39), snakes (8), lizards (4), fish (6), insects (21), birds (170), seed bearing plants and trees (97), shrubs and herbs (46), climbers, parasites and semi-parasites (25), and grasses and bamboos (17).

Demographics

According to the 2011 Indian Census, Jharkhand has a population of 32.96 million, consisting of 16.93 million males and 16.03 million females. The sex ratio is 947 females to 1,000 males. The literacy rate of the state was 67.63% with Ranchi district being most educated at 77.13% compared to rural Pakur district being least at 50.17%.

Languages

Hindi is the official language in Jharkhand and is spoken by the people of the state, although different regions have their own languages. These include Nagpuri, Khortha, Kurmali, Magahi and Bhojpuri. Jharkhand has accorded additional official language status to Angika, Bengali, Bhojpuri, Bhumij, Ho, Kharia, Kurukh, Khortha, Kurmali, Magahi, Maithili, Mundari, Nagpuri, Odia, Santali and Urdu.

Religion

As per the 2011 census, Hinduism is the majority religion in the state at 67.8%, followed by Islam at 14.5% and Christianity at 4.3%. Other religions, primarily Sarnaism, constitute 12.8% of the population.

Hindus form majority in 19 out of 24 districts of the Jharkhand. Christianity forms majority in Simdega district (51.04%). Sarna forms majority in Lohardaga (51.01%), West Singhbhum (62.29%) and plurality in Gumla (44.62%) and Khunti (45.37%). Muslims have highest presence in Pakur district and Sahebganj district of Jharkhand forming 35% and 34% of the population.

Government and administration 

The constitutional head of the government of Jharkhand is the governor, who is appointed by the President of India. The real executive power rests with the chief minister and the cabinet. The political party or the coalition of political parties having a majority in the Legislative Assembly forms the government.

The head of the bureaucracy of the state is the chief secretary. Under this position, is a hierarchy of officials drawn from the Indian Administrative Service, Indian Police Service, Indian Forest Service and different wings of the state civil services. The judiciary is headed by the Chief Justice. Jharkhand has a High Court which has been functioning since 2000. All the branches of the government are located in the state capital, Ranchi.

Administrative districts

The state was formed with 18 districts that were formerly part of south Bihar. Some of these districts were reorganised to form 6 new districts, namely, Latehar, Saraikela Kharsawan, Jamtara, Pakur, Khunti and Ramgarh. At present, the state has 5 Divisions and 24 Districts. One interesting thing about Jharkhand is that all its districts, except Lohardaga and Khunti, share a border with a neighbouring state.

Divisions and districts

Major cities
Largest Cities in Jharkhand

Economy

Jharkhand has several towns and innumerable villages with civic amenities. Urbanization ratio is 24.1%. Jharkhand also has immense mineral resources: minerals ranging from (ranking in the country within bracket) from iron ore (4th), coal (3rd), copper ore (1st), mica (1st), bauxite (3rd), manganese, limestone, china clay, fire clay, graphite (8th), kainite (1st), chromite (2nd), asbestos (1st), thorium (3rd), sillimanite, uranium (Jaduguda mines, Narwa Pahar) (1st) and even gold (Rakha Mines) (6th) and silver and several other minerals. Large deposits of coal and iron ore support concentration of industry, in centres like Jamshedpur, Dhanbad, Bokaro and Ranchi. Tata Steel, a NSE NIFTY 500 conglomerate has its corporate office and main plant in Tatanagar, Jharkhand. NTPC will start coal production from its captive mine in state in 2011–12, for which the company will be investing about Rs 18 billion.

Agriculture is another sector in the economy of Jharkhand which helps the economy to grow. In Jharkhand, farmers produce several crops such as rice, wheat, maize, pulses, potatoes, and vegetables such as tomato, carrots, cabbage, brinjal, pumpkin, and papaya. The other Industries are cottage industry and IT industry.

Culture

Cuisine

Staple foods of Jharkhand are rice, dal, vegetable and tubers. Spices are sparingly used in cuisine. Famous dishes include Chhilka Roti, Malpua, Pitha, Dhooska, Arsa roti, Dudhauri, and Panipuri (Gupchup). Rugra and Putoo is a type of edible mushroom that is grown extensively in Jharkhand and harvested during the rainy months. It has a hardened, white, edible shell and a softer dark colored centre. Bamboo shoots are also used as vegetable. The leaf of Munga (Moringa oleifera) and Koinar tree (Bauhinia variegata) used as leafy vegetable or Saag.

Local alcoholic drinks include rice beer, originally known as Handi or Handia, named after the vessel handi (earthen pot) used to make it. Handiya is culturally associated with native i.e. Sadans and Tribal, this drink consumed by both men and women, on social occasions like marriage and other festivals. Another common liquor is called Mahua daru, made from flowers of the "Mahua" tree (Madhuca longifolia).

Folk music and dance

There are several Folk dance in Jharkhand such as:Jhumair, Mardani Jhumar, Janani Jhumar, Domkach, Vinsariya, Jhumta, Fagua, Angnai, Paiki, Chhau, Firkal, Mundari and Santali dance.

Festivals
Major local festival of Jharkhand are Saraswati Puja, Sarhul, Tusu Festival, Rath Yatra, Makar Sankranti, Durga Puja, Karam, Nawakhani, Jitia, Mansa Puja, Diwali,Sohrai, Phagua, Dussehra, Ram Navami, Mage Porob,and Sendra festival

Paintings

The Sohrai and Khovar painting is a mural art form practiced by women. Sohrai painting is traditionally done at the Sohrai harvest festival, while Khovar painting is done at weddings.

Tattoo
The tattoo making tradition of Godna is an essential part of local tradition.

Cinema 

Jharkhand produce many films in regional and Tribal languages including Nagpuri, Khortha, Santali, Ho and Kurukh. Film industry in state of Jharkhand is known as Jhollywood.

Media
There are some television channel, newspapers and radio which operates in Jharkhand. DD Jharkhand is important Channel in Jharkhand. All India Radio also operates from Ranchi.

Hindustan, Dainik Jagran, Sokal Sokal, Prabhat Khabar, Ranchi Express are some of the Hindi newspapers and The Times of India, Hindustan Times, Navbharat Times, The Pioneer, The Telegraph are some English newspapers in Jharkhand.

Transport

Air
Birsa Munda Airport is the largest domestic airport in the state with air connectivity to major Indian cities of Delhi, Kolkata, Bangalore, Mumbai, Hyderabad among others.

Deoghar Airport is the second busiest airport located in the state of Jharkhand, India. It is the second operational airport in state of Jharkhand after Ranchi.

Sonari Airport at Jamshedpur is the third operational airport in the state and it has daily flight to Bhubaneswar and Kolkata.

Bokaro Airport is currently under construction and once completed will be 4th operational airport of the state. It is being developed under UDAN scheme.

Other airports present in the state are Chakulia Airport, Dumka Airport and Dhanbad Airport which mostly run private and charter flights.

Roads
Jharkhand has extensive network of National Highways and State Highways. The National highways present in the state are numbered 18, 19, 20, 22, 33, 39, 43, 114A, 118, 133, 133A, 133B, 139, 143, 143A, 143AG, 143D, 143H, 218, 220, 320D, 320G, 333, 333A, 343, 419 and 522. The Golden Quadrilateral network of Delhi – Kolkata route runs through Jharkhand notably at Dhanbad.

Ports
Jharkhand is landlocked state but has numerous rivers and waterways. A multi-modal port has been planned at Sahebganj where river Ganges flows. The project is estimated to cost 65,000 million and phase-1 is estimated to be completed by 2019.

Rail

Jharkhand is very well connected by railways. The state has numerous railway stations and railway junctions. Hilly regions of state are equipped with tunnels that form essential organ of railways.

Education
As per the 2011 census conducted by Government of India the official literacy rate for the state was 67.63% (male: 78.45%; female: 56.21%) with nine districts above the average literacy rate:
 Ranchi: 77.13% (male: 85.53%; female: 68.20%)

 East Singhbhum: 76.13% (male: 84.51%; female: 67.33%)
 Dhanbad: 75.71% (male: 85.68%; Female: 64.70%)

 Ramgarh: 73.92% (male: 83.51%; female: 63.49%)
 Bokaro: 78.48% (male: 84.50%; female: 61.46%)
 Hazaribagh: 70.48% (male: 81.15%; female: 59.25%)
 Saraikela Khasawan: 68.85% (male: 81.01%; female: 56.19%)
 Koderma: 68.35% (male: 81.25%; female: 54.77%)
 Lohardaga: 68.29% (male: 78.62%; female: 57.86%)
 Deoghar: 66.34% (male: 79.13%; female: 53.39%)

Since the formation of the new state, the Jharkhand Education Project Council (JEPC) has been implementing four projects to spread elementary education: DPEP, SSA, NPEGEL, and KGBV. The state has been moving towards the goal of universal elementary education but the target of 100% enrolment and retention of children in schools has not yet been attained. Jharkhand has made primary education so accessible that 95% of children of ages 6–11 are enrolled in school, as opposed to 56% in 1993–94; this will likely improve literacy a great deal.

Schools
The medium of instruction in schools is Hindi/English with English/Hindi/Sanskrit/Bengali/Odia as second language. After 10 years of schooling, students can join two years of Intermediate course (or +2 courses) in Arts, Science and Commerce. This is followed by three years of degree courses (graduation) or four years of Engineering/Agriculture/Medicine degree.

The school system comprises various private and public schools. The government schools are abundant. Few notable schools are: St. Thomas School, Ranchi, Sainik School Tilaiya, Loyola School, Jamshedpur, Delhi Public School, Bokaro, Delhi Public School, Ranchi, Bishop Westcott Boys' School, Ramakrishna Mission Vidyapith, Deoghar, De Nobili School and St. Xavier's School, Hazaribagh.

In 2009 Franz Gastler established Yuwa School a NGO in Hutup village in Ranchi district with helps of friends to use football as a platform to combat child marriage, illiteracy and human trafficking in rural India. In 2019, It won the Laureus Sport for Good Award.

Universities and colleges

 AISECT University, Jharkhand, Hazaribagh
 Arka Jain University, Jamshedpur
 Binod Bihari Mahto Koyalanchal University, Dhanbad
 Birsa Agricultural University, Kanke, Ranchi
 Central University of Jharkhand, Brambe, Ranchi
 Jharkhand Rai University, Ranchi
 Jharkhand Raksha Shakti University, Ranchi
 Kolhan University, Chaibasa
 National University of Study and Research in Law, Ranchi
 Nilamber-Pitamber University, Medininagar
 Ranchi University, Ranchi
 Sarala Birla University, Ranchi
 Sido Kanhu Murmu University, Dumka
 Tata College, Chaibasa
 Vinoba Bhave University, Hazaribagh

Autonomous
 Dr. Shyama Prasad Mukherjee University, formerly Ranchi college
 Indian Institute of Information Technology, Ranchi
 Indian Institute of Management Ranchi
 Indian Institute of Technology (Indian School of Mines), Dhanbad
 National Institute of Foundry and Forge Technology (NIFFT), Ranchi
 National University of Study and Research in Law
 National Institute of Technology, Jamshedpur
 St. Xavier's College, Ranchi
 Xavier Institute of Social Service (XISS), Ranchi
 Xavier Labour Relations Institute (XLRI), Jamshedpur

Agriculture
 Indian Institute of Agricultural Biotechnology, Ranchi

Engineering

 Birla Institute of Technology, Mesra, Ranchi
 Birsa Institute of Technology Sindri, Dhanbad
 DAV Institute of Engineering & Technology, Daltonganj
 Indian Institute of Technology (Indian School of Mines), Dhanbad, Dhanbad
 National Institute of Foundry and Forge Technology (NIFFT), Ranchi
 National Institute of Technology, Jamshedpur

Management
 Indian Institute of Management Ranchi IIM-Ranchi
 XLRI - Xavier School of Management, Jamshedpur
 NSIBM - Netaji Subhas Institute of Hotel & Business Management, Jamshedpur

Medical colleges 
 All India Institute of Medical Sciences (AIIMS), Deoghar
 Mahatma Gandhi Memorial Medical College (MGM), Jamshedpur
 Medinirai Medical College and Hospital, Palamu
 Phulo Jhano Murmu Medical College and Hospital, Dumka
 Rajendra Institute of Medical Sciences (RIMS), Ranchi
 Shaheed Nirmal Mahto Medical College, Dhanbad, Dhanbad
 Shaheed Sheikh Bhikhari Medical College and Hospital, Hazaribagh

Psychiatry
 Central Institute of Psychiatry, Ranchi

Public Health
Because of its mild climate, Jharkhand, particularly its capital Ranchi, has been a health resort. As far back as 1918, facilities were set up for treatment of mentally challenged.

European Mental Hospital was established along with Indian Mental Hospital. Today they are called Central Institute of Psychiatry and Ranchi Institute of Neuro-psychiatry and Allied Sciences respectively.
In certain areas of Jharkhand, poverty and consequent malnutrition have given rise to diseases like tuberculosis (TB). In fact, TB has assumed epidemic proportions in certain areas of the state. For management and treatment of such TB, Itki TB Sanatorium, Ranchi, established in 1928 has been doing work as a premier institute for clinical and programmatic management of TB. The Itki TB Sanatorium is well equipped and accredited by the Indian government for quality assurance and Culture and Drug Sensitivity Testing for M.TB. It provides free of cost treatment for TB as well as drug-resistant TB. Likewise, in the field of treatment of cancer, Tata Main Hospital, Jamshedpur, is rendering pioneering work. In the same way, Bokaro General Hospital equipped with modern facilities for the treatment of cancer and heart-related problems with the capacity of 1100 beds one of the largest in eastern India.

Although several public and private health facilities are available in the state, overall infrastructure for dispensing health related services require improvements. An exception is the Tata Motors Hospital which is an example of an ISO 14001 and 18001 certified hospital with DNB teaching facilities.

Ranchi, the capital, has witnessed a sharp growth in the number of hospitals.

Fluoride in groundwater presents a public health problem in Jharkhand. A recent survey led by the Birla Institute of Technology, Mesra, Ranchi in collaboration with UNICEF in the northwest districts of Palamau and Garhwa found fluoride levels above the drinking WHO drinking water guidelines. Excessive amounts of fluoride in drinking water can lead to dental fluorosis, prevalent bone fractures, and skeletal fluorosis, an irreversible disabling condition. Some work has focused on combating fluorosis through increased calcium intake by consuming local plants. Researchers at Princeton University and the Birla Institute of Technology, Mesra, Ranchi are currently investigating defluoridation options, while performing an epidemiological survey to assess the extent of fluoride linked health problems and the impact of future interventions.

Almost 80% of Jharkhand's people are farmers, although it contains 40% of India's mineral reserves it has some of India's poorest people, in Summer 2009 the state was threatened by drought, with people criticising the government for not providing food aid or assistance.

Sports
JRD TATA Sports Complex, Jamshedpur hosts football matches of Indian Super League and is the home of ISL based football club Jamshedpur FC.
Cricket, hockey, and football are common games in Jharkhand. Players like Jaipal Singh, a former Indian hockey captain and Olympian and Manohar Topno currently play for the Indian Hockey team. Jaipal Singh was the captain of the hockey team that won the first gold medal for India in the 1928 Summer Olympics in Amsterdam. Mahendra Singh Dhoni who was the captain of Indian cricket team and led the Indian cricket team to ICC Cricket World Cup glory on 2 April 2011, ending a 28-year wait to repeat the feat achieved by former Indian captain Kapil Dev in 1983 at Lord's, England is from here.

Other notable cricketers from Jharkhand are Varun Aaron, Shahbaz Nadeem, and Saurabh Tiwary. He was one of the key batsmen in the Indian team that won the 2008 U/19 Cricket World Cup in Malaysia.  Other sportspeople include Deepika Kumari, a young archer who won gold medal in the 2010 Commonwealth games in the women's individual recurve event. Nikki Pradhan currently a member of the national hockey team. Pradhan was the first female hockey player from Jharkhand to represent India in the Olympics.

An International Cricket stadium with an indoor stadium and a practice ground has been constructed. This international stadium has hosted an International match between India and England on 19 January 2013. Apart from that, this stadium has hosted two IPL 6 matches for KKR and qualifier 2 of IPL 8 between CSK and RCB and Celebrity Cricket League Matches for Bhojpuri Dabanggs. A tennis academy, which was inaugurated by Sania Mirza and Shoaib Malik, also runs besides the cricket stadium. Ranchi is among six cities in Hockey India League to be played in January 2013. Ranchi franchise was bought by Patel-Uniexcel Group and the team named Ranchi Rhinos which is now being co-hosted by Mahendra Singh Dhoni and named as Ranchi Rays.

Tourism

Jharkhand is known for its waterfalls, hills and holy places. Parasnath, Baidyanath Dham, Maa Dewri Temple and Chhinnamasta Temple are major religious places.

Tattapani Hot Water Spring is located 8 km from Latehar. The hot spring water come out from different places on the Sukari River bed. Reach in sulphur, the hot spring is believed to have medicinal properties and good for skin.

Itkhori is a holy place for Hindus, Buddhists and Jains. It is believed to be the place from where Gautama Buddha started his journey for Bodh Gaya. Many sculptures of Hindu, Jain and Buddhist art styles were found in 2018. Rankini Temple of Jadugora is famous in Jharkhand, as well as in Odisha, West Bengal and Bihar. There are several waterfalls in the state including Jonha Falls, Hundru Falls, Dassam Falls, Perwaghagh Falls and Panchghagh Falls. Netarhat is a hill station in the state.

There are several wildlife sanctuaries in Jharkhand including Betla National Park and Dalma Wildlife Sanctuary which are major attraction for tourists.

There is a Tribal Research Institute and Museum in Ranchi aimed at studying the psychological factors that contribute to the changes of the nature of adolescent rural tribal students in urban environment.

See also
 List of people from Jharkhand
 JSCA International Stadium Complex
 Outline of India

References

Works cited

External links

Government
 Government of Jharkhand, India

General information
 
 

 
States and union territories of India
States and territories established in 2000
2000 establishments in India